Saint-Petersburg State Economic University (Dubai branch) is a branch of Saint-Petersburg State Economic University (Russia), which started its operations in Dubai, United Arab Emirates in 2005.

Saint-Petersburg State Economic University is one of the largest economic universities in Russia with more than 50 000 students,  40 Bachelor's and 90 Master's degree programs, and over 20 regional and international branches across the globe.

Accreditation and recognition 
The University has a license and accreditation certificate issued by the Ministry of Education and Science of the Russian Federation, as well as authorized by KHDA and licensed by DMCC for educational activities.

Academic programs

Undergraduate 
 Bachelor of Management
 Bachelor of Tourism and Hotel Management
 Bachelor of Logistics Management

Postgraduate 
 Master's programme in International Tourism Business
 Master's programme in petroleum and crew technology management

References 

Universities and colleges in Dubai